Cranfills Gap is a city located in Bosque County in central Texas, United States. It was founded by Norwegian Emigrants and to this day most residents can trace their lineage to those  Norwegian Founders. The population was 281 at the 2010 census.

Geography

Cranfills Gap is located in western Bosque County at  (31.773727, –97.828335). Its western border is the Hamilton County line. Texas State Highway 22 passes through the city, leading northeast  to Meridian, the Bosque county seat, and west  to Hamilton.

History
The area in which Cranfills Gap is located was originally settled by and named for George Eaton Cranfill in 1851.

Norwegian settlers in and around the community, who were mostly Lutheran, built St. Olaf Kirke (kirke is Norwegian for "church") in a rural area just outside Cranfills Gap.  St. Olaf Kirke, commonly referred to as The Rock Church, is a small Lutheran church located in the unincorporated rural community of Norse, Texas. Among the pioneers in Norse was Cleng Peerson. The founder of Norse was Ole Canuteson (Ole Knudsen) from the Stavanger region of Norway. In 1917, as the congregation of that church began to grow, a new church was built for the congregation inside the city.

The city slowly grew to its peak population of 600 in 1940.  During World War II, Cranfills Gap was the first city to sell more than its quota of war bonds for the Fourth War Loan Drive. While as many as 25 businesses operated within "the gap", as locals commonly refer to it, the population and the business activity slowly dwindled to roughly nine businesses in 1980 and a population of 269 in 1990.

On December 3, 2008, KXXV-TV in nearby Waco reported on its website that Cranfills Gap had been selected for participation in an advertising campaign for the Las Vegas Convention and Visitors Authority. The selection process compared hundreds of rural communities from across the USA seeking "the most unique all-American town in all of the 50 states." Cranfills Gap was first contacted by the LVCVA in October 2008 when the town was placed on the list of ten candidate communities. A film crew and LVCVA representative visited the town for a few days and interviewed residents about the town, their impressions of and experience with Las Vegas, and their opinions about the ongoing selection process. In November 2008, Cranfills Gap Chamber of Commerce members were notified that the LVCVA had shortened the list to two finalists including their town. Another LVCVA delegation was dispatched to Cranfills Gap for a closer look. The visitors stayed for about a week and conducted a fresh set of interviews and observed the community at work and play. Although the LVCVA had initially intended to send 150 residents from the winning locality to Sin City, the Cranfills Gap Chamber of Commerce and elected officials struck a feasible compromise with their visitors: if selected, Cranfills Gap would make every effort to provide one hundred adult men and women for the LVCVA's project. During the first week of December 2008, Cranfills Gap and local media were notified by LVCVA that the town had won the nationwide search and 100 of its residents would be sent on a free trip to Las Vegas during the weekend of December 5–7, 2008. Cranfills Gap City Council member Ron Hubbard told the press that he sincerely hoped Cranfills Gap would reap benefits from the ad campaign beyond just plane tickets and memories. "With that national recognition, maybe people will come visit, see what we're all about," said Hubbard.

Demographics

As of the census of 2000, there were 335 people, 132 households, and 90 families residing in the city. The population density was 459.9 people per square mile (177.2/km2). There were 156 housing units at an average density of 214.2 per square mile (82.5/km2). The racial makeup of the city was 91.34% White, 0.30% African American, 0.90% Native American, 4.78% from other races, and 2.69% from two or more races. Hispanic or Latino of any race were 8.66% of the population.

There were 132 households, out of which 37.9% had children under the age of 18 living with them, 53.8% were married couples living together, 9.8% had a female householder with no husband present, and 31.1% were non-families. 28.8% of all households were made up of individuals, and 16.7% had someone living alone who was 65 years of age or older. The average household size was 2.54 and the average family size was 3.13.

In the city, the population was spread out, with 29.3% under the age of 18, 6.6% from 18 to 24, 23.0% from 25 to 44, 24.8% from 45 to 64, and 16.4% who were 65 years of age or older. The median age was 40 years. For every 100 females, there were 106.8 males. For every 100 females age 18 and over, there were 100.8 males.

The median income for a household in the city was $26,484, and the median income for a family was $31,389. Males had a median income of $26,250 versus $15,250 for females. The per capita income for the city was $15,405. About 14.3% of families and 14.0% of the population were below the poverty line, including 19.0% of those under age 18 and 7.3% of those age 65 or over.

Education
Cranfills Gap is served by the Cranfills Gap Independent School District.

Climate
The climate in this area is characterized by hot, humid summers and generally mild to cool winters.  According to the Köppen Climate Classification system, Cranfills Gap has a humid subtropical climate, abbreviated "Cfa" on climate maps.

References

External links

 City of Cranfills Gap official website
 Cranfills Gap Chamber of Commerce
 Handbook of Texas Online – Cranfills Gap article

Cities in Bosque County, Texas
Cities in Texas